Haunted State: Theatre of Shadows is a 2017 American documentary film executive produced and directed by Michael Brown. It is the second installment of the Haunted State film series. The film's plot focuses on investigations inside Wisconsin theatres that have paranormal claims surrounding it. The film premiered October 25, 2017 at the historic Oriental Theatre in Milwaukee, Wisconsin and it began streaming on Amazon Prime Video on January 2, 2018.

Film locations
 Pabst Brewery, Milwaukee, Wisconsin
 Barrymore Theatre, Madison, Wisconsin
 Riverside Theatre, Milwaukee, Wisconsin
 Oshkosh Grand Opera House, Oshkosh, Wisconsin
 Pabst Theater, Milwaukee, Wisconsin

Cast
(All as themselves)
 Michael Brown
 Anne Benson
 Todd Dehring
 David Williams
 Angela Olson
 Amy Flunker
 Jason Mansmith
 Chelsy Stine
 Sonya Rose

References

External links
 
 

Films shot in Wisconsin
Documentary films about the paranormal
American documentary films
2010s English-language films
2010s American films